Makuach village is a  boma in  Makuach payam, Bor Central County, Jonglei State, South Sudan, about 15 kilometers east of Bor.

Demographics
According to the Fifth Population and Housing Census of Sudan, conducted in April 2008, Makuach  boma had a population of 5,555 people, composed of 2,721 male and 2,834 female residents.

Notes

References 

Populated places in Jonglei State